Emmerson Arthur Marbles (5 December 1878 – 1964) was an English professional footballer who played as a full-back for Sunderland.

References

1878 births
1964 deaths
Footballers from Chesterfield
English footballers
Association football fullbacks
Dronfield Town F.C. players
Chesterfield F.C. players
Sunderland A.F.C. players
Eckington Works F.C. players
English Football League players